Muaro Jambi Regency is a regency of Jambi Province, Sumatra, Indonesia. From the 4th until the 13th century, it was the seat of the Hindu-Buddhist Melayu Kingdom. It has an area of 5,246.00 km2 and had a population of 342,952 at the 2010 census and 390,347 at the 2020 census.

Administrative districts
At the time of the 2010 census, the regency was divided into eight districts (kecamatan): Jambi Luar Kota (Jambi city's suburbs), Kumpeh, Kumpeh Ulu, Maro Sebo, Mestong, Sekernan, Sungai Bahar (Bahar River) and Sungai Gelam (Gelam River). Subsequently, another three districts have been added by splitting away from existing districts - Bahar Selatan (South Bahar), Bahar Utara (North Bahar) and Taman Rajo.

These eleven districts are tabulated below with their areas and their populations at the 2010 census and the 2020 census. The table also includes the locations of the district administrative centres, and the number of administrative villages (rural desa and urban kelurahan) in each district.

Note: (a) The 2010 population of the new Bahar Selatan and Bahar Utara districts are included with that of the existing Sungai Bahar District, from which they were cut out. (b) The 2010 population of the new Taman Rajo District is included with that of the existing Maro Sebo District, from which it was cut out.

Archaeology
Located within this regency, the Muaro Jambi Temple Compounds is one of the largest archaeological complex in Sumatra. The archaeological site is located some 22 km downstream from the modern capital, on the opposite bank, it has the ancient Hindu Candi and Menapo or brick-built temples and canals. Restoration of three main structures Candi Tinggi, Candi Gumpung and Candi Kedaton, the last with an unusual fill of small white river pebbles, has been completed.

See also
Dharmakīrtiśrī

References

External links
 Muarojambi Temple Compound - UNESCO world heritage tentative list
 https://web.archive.org/web/20100521045224/http://inspirasipakde.com/2009/02/17/journey-to-the-past/
 https://web.archive.org/web/20140823075620/http://jambi.bebasnews.com/

Regencies of Jambi
Former populated places in Indonesia